Litoria eurynastes is a frog in the subfamily Pelodryadinae, endemic to Papua New Guinea.  It resembles Litoria bicolor, but it is larger.

Adult male frogs measure 25.7 to 31.5 mm in snout-vent length.  Adult female frogs measure 27.3 to 33.0 mm.  Some adult frogs have vomerine teeth in their upper jaws.  They have more webbing on the hind feet than on the forefeet.  There are five groups of Litoria eurynastes living in the wild, and they are not all the same color.  They can be bright green, yellow-green, or brownish-green.  Some of them have gold or light green stripes.  There is a disc on each finger.

The Greek name eurynastes means wide-dwelling.

References

Species described in 2008
eurynastes